Audun Ove Olsen (born 30 May 1951) is a former speedway rider from Norway.

Speedway career 
Ove Olsen is a three times champion of Norway, winning the Norwegian Championship in 1977, 1979 and 1981.

He rode in the top tier of British Speedway in 1976 and 1980, riding for Birmingham Brummies.

References 

1951 births
Living people
Norwegian speedway riders
Birmingham Brummies riders
Norwegian expatriate sportspeople in England